Richard Jones, 1st Earl of Ranelagh  (8 February 1641 – 5 January 1712), known as The Viscount Ranelagh between 1669 and 1677, was an Irish peer, politician both in the Parliaments of England and Ireland.

Background
He was the eldest son of Arthur Jones, 2nd Viscount Ranelagh and Katherine Boyle, daughter of the Earl of Cork who counted amongst her brothers the chemist Robert Boyle and Lord Broghill, the later Earl of Orrery who was a prominent politician in Cromwellian and Restoration times. Jones's mother was estranged from her husband who appears to have been a drunkard and Richard Jones was largely brought up in his mother's household in London.

Irish parliamentary career
Following the Restoration of Charles II he became a member of the Irish Parliament for Roscommon, and in 1668 was appointed to the Privy Council of Ireland. In the Irish parliament, Ranelagh was associated initially with the group which opposed the land settlement being proposed by Ormond, the then viceroy, but upon appointment to the government as chancellor of the exchequer (a relatively minor role), he became a strong supporter of Ormond's. He accompanied the new Viceroy, Berkeley on his trip to England in 1671 when Lord Aungier (later earl of Longford), the vice treasurer, presented a grim view of Irish finances and crown debts. Ranelagh seized this opportunity to reinterpret the situation as one where the crown, far from being indebted, could reap a profit from Ireland if it managed monies owing to the crown and the government finances differently. Ranelagh was granted an 'undertaking' whereby he and a partnership took on the crown debts and effectively 'privatised' the treasury. Ranelagh was rewarded personally with his earldom and the role of vice-treasurer of Ireland. Throughout the whole of Essex's vice-royalty from 1672 to 1677 Ranelagh wielded real influence on the Irish government from Whitehall developing a strong relationship with the Earl of Danby, the English Treasurer who was effectively Charles's first minister.

English parliamentary career
When the undertaking finished in 1675 it was not renewed, but the Crown was now clear of all debts. Ranelagh ensured regular payments were made to the English Treasury, some of which paid for troops for Charles and some of which went to the renovation of Windsor Castle. This was largely achieved through short payment of the Irish army which was Ranelagh's training ground for his later embezzlements as Paymaster General to the English army. His skill, however, lay in his efficiency—for all his short payments the Irish army were in fact better paid than in the previous ill-managed regime. He ceased his involvement in Irish affairs in 1681 when the Irish treasury was handed over to a group of treasury commissioners.

Ranelagh remained closely associated with Danby after 1675, but when the latter fell from power he remained a loyalist to Charles and an associate of the Duchess of Portsmouth and of the Earl of Sunderland. He remained in royal favour during James IIs reign, but when William III and Mary II came to the throne he was able to transfer his loyalties and become a senior figure in the new regime (his old friend the Earl of Danby was one of the seven who signed the Invitation to William).

In 1670 he inherited his father's viscountcy, and in 1674 was created First Earl of Ranelagh. Both these peerages being in the Peerage of Ireland they did not disqualify him from sitting in the English House of Commons and in 1685 was elected as MP for Plymouth; in the same year he was appointed to the lucrative post of Paymaster of the Forces. He was subsequently member for Newtown (Isle of Wight), Chichester, Marlborough and West Looe, and was made a member of the English Privy Council in 1692.

Ranelagh was expelled from the Commons in 1703 when discrepancies were found in his accounts as Paymaster, and he was discovered to have appropriated more than £900,000 of public funds.

Family and later life
Ranelagh was well known in his time for enjoying life. He had a wife, Margaret Cecil, and three daughters by his first wife Elizabeth Willoughby, but there are suggestions that he was at least bisexual, and that he led a rakish life. He was known for his building works in terms of homes, his involvement with the building of Chelsea Hospital and his adjacent home Ranelagh house, which no longer exists but whose associated pleasure gardens were later transferred to the hospital and still bear his name. His country estate was Cranbourne Lodge, now in the Great Park at Windsor in Berkshire, where he was Ranger of Cranbourne Chase. He founded Ranelagh School at nearby Cranbourne (since moved to Bracknell).

Ranelagh died in 1712 and due to his lack of a legitimate male heir his earldom became extinct, and the viscountcy dormant. His son with Elizabeth, Edward Jones, styled Lord Navan, had died, age 3, on 29 March 1678.

Irish Properties
Richard Earl of Ranelagh owned very substantial properties in Co. Roscommon including the town of Roscommon, in Co.Dublin, Co. Meath and Co. Westmeath in the year 1704.

References

18th Century British Parliamentary Papers

1641 births
1712 deaths
Jones, Richard
Members of the pre-1707 English Parliament for constituencies in Cornwall
Members of the Privy Council of Ireland
Earls in the Peerage of Ireland
Jones, Richard
Members of the Parliament of Ireland (pre-1801) for County Roscommon constituencies
People from Windsor, Berkshire
English MPs 1685–1687
English MPs 1689–1690
English MPs 1690–1695
English MPs 1695–1698
English MPs 1698–1700
English MPs 1701
English MPs 1701–1702
English MPs 1702–1705
Jones, Richard
Members of Parliament for the Isle of Wight
Members of the Parliament of England for Plymouth